The Elouera Surf Lifesaving Club is an Australian surf lifesaving club in Cronulla, New South Wales. 

The club was established in 1966. On the official opening of the clubhouse on 8 June 1967, the club's first surf boat Charlotte Breen, donated by local businessman Tom Breen, was christened and launched. 

The Elouera "Sharks" had 375 members in the initial season.

See also

Surf lifesaving
Surf Life Saving Australia
List of Australian surf lifesaving clubs

References

External links
 

1966 establishments in Australia
Sports clubs established in 1966
Surf Life Saving Australia clubs
Sporting clubs in Sydney